Natalio Lorenzo Poquet (born 18 September 1984), known simply as Natalio, is a Spanish professional footballer who plays for Real Avilés CF usually as a forward.

He played 358 games in the Segunda División over 11 seasons, totalling 70 goals for eight clubs (mainly Numancia). In La Liga, he represented Almería.

Club career
Born in Canals, Valencia, Valencian Community, Natalio played his first years as a professional with lowly clubs, being bought by Segunda División B's CD Castellón in 2005 and spending his first season on loan to FC Cartagena, also in that level.

Returning for the 2006–07 campaign, with Castellón now in the Segunda División, Natalio scored a team-best 15 goals as the team managed to retain their league status. In that summer, he signed with UD Almería as both player and club had their first La Liga experience, and made his competition debut on 15 September 2007, playing 20 minutes in a 3–1 away loss against Real Madrid. He ultimately failed to settle at the Andalusians, being consecutively loaned for the duration of his contract; he also did not manage to score in the league during his tenure.

On 21 November 2009, Natalio scored three times for Real Murcia in a 3–0 home win over Real Unión. A starter throughout the division two season, he saw his team get relegated in the last matchday after a 1–1 draw at Girona FC (which in turn managed to stay afloat).

Natalio was definitely released by Almería in June 2010, agreeing to a three-year contract at second-tier CD Tenerife on 16 July. In the following summer, after the Canary Islands side suffered a second consecutive relegation, he stayed in the league and signed for CD Numancia.

After several seasons of regular playing time, Natalio joined UE Llagostera still in the second division on 27 January 2016. After being relegated, he moved to newly-promoted UCAM Murcia CF on 30 June.

On 14 July 2017, aged 32, Natalio moved abroad for the first time in his career and signed with China League One club Yunnan Lijiang FC.

External links

External links

1984 births
Living people
Spanish footballers
Footballers from Valencia (city)
Association football forwards
La Liga players
Segunda División players
Segunda División B players
Tercera División players
Segunda Federación players
Villajoyosa CF footballers
CD Castellón footballers
FC Cartagena footballers
UD Almería players
Cádiz CF players
Córdoba CF players
Real Murcia players
CD Tenerife players
CD Numancia players
UE Costa Brava players
UCAM Murcia CF players
Recreativo de Huelva players
CF Badalona players
UE Olot players
Real Avilés CF footballers
China League One players
Yunnan Flying Tigers F.C. players
Spanish expatriate footballers
Expatriate footballers in China
Spanish expatriate sportspeople in China